Midnight Predator is a vampire novel written by Amelia Atwater-Rhodes, published in 2002 when the author was 18. The novel was an ALA Quick Pick and “a must-read” according to School Library Journal, who also wrote that “the plot and characters are so skillfully intertwined that each one moves the story to its thoughtful ending.” Fannie Heaslip Lea’s poem "The Dead Faith" appears in the beginning of the book.

Summary
Though she was once a happy teenager with a wonderful family and a full life, Turquoise Draka is now a hunter, committed to no higher purpose than making money and staying alive. In a deadly world of vampires, shape-shifters, and powerful mercenaries, she'll track any prey if the
price is right. Her current assignment: to assassinate Jeshickah, one of the cruelest vampires in history. Her employer: an unknown contact who wants the job done fast. Her major obstacle: she'll have to mask her strength and enter Midnight, a fabled Vampire realm, as a human slave.  Vulnerable and defenseless, she faces her greatest challenge ever.

References

2002 American novels
American vampire novels
Novels by Amelia Atwater-Rhodes
Vampire novels
Nyeusigrube
Den of Shadows